SSS or Sss may refer to:

Places
 SSS islands, part of the Netherlands Antilles
 Sheerness-on-Sea railway station, Kent, England, National Rail station code
 Siassi's airport IATA code
 Southern Cross railway station (formerly Spencer Street), Melbourne, Australia, code

Businesses and organizations
 Sisters of Social Service, a Catholic religious institute founded in Hungary
 Societas Sanctissimi Sacramenti, the Congregation of the Blessed Sacrament
 Sovran Self Storage, US, NYSE SSS
 SSS Defence, an Indian firm
 Triple-S Management Corporation

Schools
 Serangoon Secondary School, a secondary school in Hougang, Singapore
 Singapore Sports School, a specialised independent school in Woodlands, Singapore
 Socialist Sunday School or Socialist School of Science, UK and US
 Smithfield-Selma School, North Carolina, US

Computing
 Shamir's Secret Sharing, an algorithm for dividing a secret into multiple pieces
 Single-serving site, a website composed of one page that serves one purpose
 Solid-state storage
 Subsurface scattering, a mechanism of light transport in 3D graphics
 Super Scalable System, Cray-3/SSS massively parallel supercomputer project
 SSS*, a state-space search algorithm

Fiction
 SSS (Three-Speed), character in the anime series MADLAX
 Sport Searching School, the fictional school from Sport Ranger

Medicine
 Scotopic sensitivity syndrome, alternate term for Irlen syndrome, a visual disorder
 Sensation Seeking Scale, a psychological measurement
 Sick sinus syndrome, an abnormality of heart rhythm
 Subclavian steal syndrome, a medical condition arising from reversed blood flow
 Superior sagittal sinus, an anatomical structure in the skull which drains cerebrospinal fluid and venous blood

Music
 SSS International, a record label founded by Shelby Sumpter Singleton
 Sigue Sigue Sputnik, a British new wave band
 Short Sharp Shock (band), a crossover thrash band from Liverpool, UK
 SunSet Swish, a Japanese pop rock band
 Sisyphus (hip hop group), an American hip hop group formerly known as S / S / S
 Super Star Supporters, a fan club for SS501
 Solid State Survivor, a 1979 album by Yellow Magic Orchestra
 SweetSexySavage, a 2017 album by Kehlani
 "SSS", a song by The Avett Brothers from Mignonette
 "SSS", a song by Trickbaby from Hanging Around

Science
 Sea surface salinity
 Sign Systems Studies, journal of semiotics
 Super Soft Source or Super soft X-ray source
 Omega baryon (Ω−), with a quark content of sss
 Side-side-side, solution of triangles with 3 sides known
 Siding Spring Survey in astronomy

Sports and entertainment
 Súper Sábado Sensacional, Venezuelan TV programme
 Super Special Stage in motor rallying
 Swedish Swing Society, a Swedish dance club
 Standard Scratch Score, a golf handicapping system
SSS, the production code for the 1973 Doctor Who serial Planet of the Daleks

Government and politics
 Selective Service System, the United States' military conscription program
 Social security system
 Social Security System (Philippines)
 State Security Service, Nigerian domestic intelligence agency
 Svensk Socialistisk Samling, Swedish Socialist Unity, former Swedish Nazi party

Linguistics
 Sign Supported Speech, a combination of sign language and English speech
 Sutton's Sign Symbol Sequence, now the International Movement Writing Alphabet, symbols to record movement

Other
 SATS Security Services at Singapore Changi Airport
 Senior Staff Sergeant, a rank in the Singapore Police Force
 Super SteadyShot, Sony image stabilization system